The following highways are numbered 33B:

United States
 Nevada State Route 33B (former)
 New York State Route 33B, three former roads

See also
 List of highways numbered 33